3x3 basketball at the 2012 Asian Beach Games was held from 17 June to 19 June 2012 in Haiyang, China.

Medalists

Medal table

Results

Men

Preliminary round

Group A

Group B

Group C

Main round

Group E

Group F

Final round

Classification 5th–6th

Bronze medal game

Gold medal game

Women

Preliminary round

Group A

Group B

Classification 5th–6th

Final round

Semifinals

Bronze medal game

Gold medal game

References

 Results Book

External links
 Official website

2012
basketball
2011–12 in Asian basketball
2011–12 in Chinese basketball
International basketball competitions hosted by China
2012 in 3x3 basketball